Drive is the tenth studio album by American country music artist Alan Jackson. Released in 2002 on Arista Nashville, the album produced Jackson's highest-debuting single on the Hot Country Songs charts in the number 1 hit, "Where Were You (When the World Stopped Turning)", a ballad written in response to the September 11, 2001 terrorist attacks. "Drive (For Daddy Gene)", "Work in Progress", and "That'd Be Alright" were also released as singles, peaking at number 1, number 3, and number 2, respectively, on the same chart; "Designated Drinker" also reached number 44 without officially being released. In addition, all four released singles cracked the Top 40 on the Billboard Hot 100, peaking at numbers 28, 28, 35 and 29, respectively.

Reception

At the 2003 Academy of Country Music Awards, Jackson was nominated for 10 awards winning Album of the Year for Drive and Video of the Year for the video to  "Drive (For Daddy Gene)."

In 2009, Rhapsody ranked the album number 3 on its "Country’s Best Albums of the Decade" list.

Track listing

Personnel

 Eddie Bayers – drums
 J. T. Corenflos – electric guitar
 Stuart Duncan – fiddle, mandolin
 Robbie Flint – steel guitar (track 13)
 Paul Franklin – steel guitar
 Vince Gill – introduction (track 13)
 Danny Groah – electric guitar (track 13)
 Greenwood Hart - acoustic guitar, piano, accordion
 Wes Hightower – background vocals
 Jim Hoke – harmonica
 Alan Jackson – acoustic guitar (track 13), lead vocals
 Irene Kelley – background vocals
 John Kelton – tic-tac bass 
 Matthew McCauley – conductor, string arrangements
 Mark McClurg – fiddle (track 13)
 Brent Mason – electric guitar
 Gordon Mote – keyboards, piano
 The Nashville String Machine - strings
 Monty Parkey – piano (track 13)
 Dave Pomeroy – bass guitar
 Bruce Rutherford – drums (track 13)
 Tom Rutledge – acoustic guitar (track 13)
 Kim Parent - background vocals
 John Wesley Ryles – background vocals
 Marty Slayton - background vocals (track 13)
 Tony Stephens – acoustic guitar (track 13)
 George Strait – duet vocals (track 6)
 Bruce Watkins – banjo, acoustic guitar
 Bergen White – conductor (track 13)
 Roger Wills – bass guitar (track 13)
 Glenn Worf – bass guitar

Chart performance
Drive debuted at number 1 on the U.S. Billboard 200, his first number 1 debut, and debuted at number 1 on the Top Country Albums selling 211,000 copies, his sixth number 1 Country album. The album was certified 4× Platinum by the RIAA in May 2003.

Weekly charts

Year-end charts

Sales and Certifications

References

2002 albums
Alan Jackson albums
Arista Records albums
Albums produced by Keith Stegall
Arista Nashville albums